The Women's Cricket Association (WCA) was responsible for the running of women's cricket in England between 1926 and 1998. It was formed by a group of enthusiasts following a cricket holiday in Malvern. Forty-nine games were arranged in that first season, and the popular cricket festival at Stowe Lane, Colwall, which is still held today, was launched.

By the following season there were ten affiliated clubs, by 1934 there were eighty, and by 1938 the number had reached 123. At its peak there were 208 affiliated clubs and 94 school and junior teams.

By 1931 the first county associations had been formed, and Durham played a combined Cheshire and Lancashire XI. Four years later the country was divided into five regional associations: East, Midlands, North, South and West.

The WCA administered the Women's Area Championship (1980–1996), the Women's Territorial Tournament (1988–1994) and the first Women's County Championship season, in 1997. In 1998, the WCA handed over the running of women's cricket in England to the England and Wales Cricket Board (ECB) and disbanded.

See also

Netta Rheinberg and Rachael Heyhoe-Flint, Fair Play - the story of women's cricket, Angus & Robertson, 1976, .

External links 
History of women's cricket
ECB women's cricket pages

History of women's cricket
Cricket administration
Women's cricket in England
Cricket administration in England
Sports organizations established in 1926
1926 establishments in England
Organizations disestablished in 1998
Women's organisations based in England
1998 disestablishments in England